General elections were held in Rwanda on 10 March 1965, the first direct one in the country and the first since independence in 1962. At the time, the country was a one-party state with MDR-Parmehutu as the sole legal party. Its leader, Grégoire Kayibanda, ran unopposed in the country's first election for President. Voter turnout was 87.6%.

Electoral system
The 47 members of the National Assembly elections were elected in ten multi-member constituencies. Voters could approve the entire MDR-Parmehutu list, or give a preferential vote to a single candidate.

Results

President

National Assembly

References

Elections in Rwanda
1965 in Rwanda
Rwanda
One-party elections
Parliament of Rwanda
Presidential elections in Rwanda